Libellus Sanguinis is a line of four tabletop role-playing game supplements released by White Wolf Publishing in 1997–2001, for use with their game Vampire: The Dark Ages. The line includes Masters of the State (1997), Keepers of the Word (1998), Wolves at the Door (2000), and Thieves in the Night (2001).

Contents
The Libellus Sanguinis line consists of four sourcebooks intended to be used with the tabletop role-playing game Vampire: The Dark Ages. They each describe three of the vampire clans in the setting, as they appeared in medieval times.

 Libellus Sanguinis 1: Masters of the State was released in September 1997, and covers the three clans of vampire nobility: Lasombra, Tzimisce, and Ventrue.
 Libellus Sanguinis 2: Keepers of the Word was released in October–December 1998, and covers the clans Brujah, Toreador, and Tremere.
 Libellus Sanguinis 3: Wolves at the Door was released in 2000, and covers the clans Assamite, Gangrel, and Followers of Set.
 Libellus Sanguinis 4: Thieves in the Night was released in December 2001, and covers the clans Malkavian, Nosferatu, and Ravnos.

Reviews
Dragon #247
Backstab #6
Backstab #14
SF Site

References

Role-playing game books
Role-playing game supplements introduced in 1997
Vampire: The Masquerade